The ProMX Motocross Championship (known for sponsorship reasons as the Penrite ProMX Motocross Championship), is the premier Australian Motocross series, sanctioned by Motorcycling Australia. The series runs throughout autumn and winter, before the Supercross stadium series in spring, and features three classes; the premier class MX1, MX2, and MX3, which also features junior riders. An MXW class for women is also part of the series.

History
The series has been held under various names, such as the MX Nationals and Australian Motocross Championship, since the 20th century.

The ProMX series began in 2021, however this season was cut short by the COVID-19 pandemic. 

The series returned in 2022, with eight rounds across the country.

Attendance and media

Attendance
Races are typically attended by crowds between 3000 and 5000 people, depending on where the event is being staged and which classes are competing. Many venues are located in regional centres, where the sport tends to be more popular due to the terrain being more friendly to the sport.

Broadcast

Australia

International
Select races are also broadcast on Sky Sport in New Zealand.

The ProMX livestream is also available overseas, showing the MX3 and MX2 first motos.

2023 season
In 2023, there will be a total of eight events across four different states. All events except the fourth round and the final round are one-day meets.

2023 calendar

List of Champions

References

External links
 

Motorcycle racing in Australia
Motocross